This is a list of townships in North Dakota, based on United States Geological Survey and U.S. Census data as of 2010.

Former townships

2000 census
Townships included in the 2000 census which no longest exist:

Duplicated names
Townships with the same name in different counties:

See also
 List of townships in North Dakota by county
 List of counties in North Dakota
 List of cities in North Dakota
 :Category:Defunct townships in North Dakota

References

External links
U.S. Board on Geographic Names
U.S. Census Bureau TIGER/Line

Townships
North Dakota